The 2022 COSAFA Cup was the 21st edition of the annual association football competition organized by COSAFA. It was held in South Africa for the 5th straight year, this time in Durban, from 5 to 17 July 2022.

South Africa was the defending champion, having defeated Senegal, 5–4 in a penalty shoot out in the previous edition's final on 17 July 2021.

Participating nations

Venues

Draw
The draw for the group stage 2022 COSAFA Cup was held on 14 June 2022 in the host city Durban.

Group stage

Group A

Group B

Knockout stage

Quarter-finals

Plate Semi-finals

Semi-finals

Plate Final

Third place play-off

Final

Statistics

Goalscorers

References

COSAFA Cup
2022 in African football
International association football competitions hosted by South Africa
July 2022 sports events in Africa
2021–22 in South African soccer
Sports competitions in Durban